is Japanese light novel series written by Ghost Mikawa and illustrated by Tomari. The series began publication by SB Creative under their GA Bunko imprint in April 2019. The light novel is licensed in North America by J-Novel Club. A manga adaptation by Hira Hiraoka began serialization online in December 2019. An anime television series adaptation has been announced.

Characters

Akiteru is a second year high school student. In the series, Akiteru calls himself a well-rounded average student but still has a hidden side to him.

Iroha is Akiteru's best friend's younger sister. In the story, Iroha is a bright, kind, and beautiful honor student. She is described as an excitable person who cannot read the atmosphere. She aims to become a voice actress.

Mashiro is a school is a second year high school student, classmate and cousin of Akiteru. In the story, Mashiro is described as a gentle person when meeting strangers with a cold demeanor towards Akiteru.

Ozuma is a second year high school student. In the story Ozuma is a kind and caring person. He is described as "beautiful like a prince" and is a genius programmer. Ozuma is Akiteru's only friend and has absolute faith in Akiteru due to some past events.

Sumire is Akiteru's subject teacher. She is described as ruthless guidance and a poisonous tongue.

Media

Light novels
The light novel series is written by Ghost Mikawa and features illustrations by Tomari. It is published by SB Creative under their GA Bunko imprint, with the first volume being released on April 15, 2019; ten volumes have been released as of October 2022. The series is licensed in English by J-Novel Club.

Manga
A manga adaptation by Hira Hiraoka began serialization in Square Enix's Manga UP! online web service on December 13, 2019 and has been compiled into six tankōbon volumes as of February 2023.

Anime
An anime television series adaptation was announced during a livestream for the "GA Fes 2021" event on January 31, 2021. The cast of the series' drama CDs are reprising their roles.

See also
 Gimai Seikatsu, a mixed-media project by the same author
 Spy Classroom, another light novel series illustrated by the same illustrator

References

External links
 

2019 Japanese novels
Anime and manga based on light novels
GA Bunko
Gangan Comics manga
Japanese webcomics
J-Novel Club books
Light novels
Romantic comedy anime and manga
Shōnen manga
Upcoming anime television series
Webcomics in print